Mencke is a German language surname. Notable people with the name include:
 Bruno Mencke (1876–1901), German explorer and collector
 Otto Mencke (1644–1707), German philosopher and scientist

References 

German-language surnames
Surnames from given names